The second season of Chicago P.D., an American police drama television series with executive producer Dick Wolf, and producers Derek Haas, Michael Brandt, and Matt Olmstead, began airing on September 24, 2014, at 10:00 p.m. Eastern/9:00 p.m. Central, and concluded on May 20, 2015 on the NBC television network. The season contained 23 episodes.

Cast and characters

Regular
 Jason Beghe as Sergeant Henry "Hank" Voight
 Jon Seda as Detective Antonio Dawson
 Sophia Bush as Detective Erin Lindsay
 Jesse Lee Soffer as Detective Jay Halstead
 Patrick John Flueger as Officer Adam Ruzek
 Marina Squerciati as Officer Kim Burgess
 LaRoyce Hawkins as Officer Kevin Atwater
 Amy Morton as Desk Sergeant Trudy Platt
 Brian Geraghty as Officer Sean Roman
 Elias Koteas as Detective Alvin Olinsky

Recurring
 Stella Maeve as Nadia DeCotis
 Kevin J. O'Connor as Commander Fischer
 Markie Post as Barbara "Bunny" Fletcher
 Samuel Hunt as Greg "Mouse" Gerwitz
 Chris Agos as Assistant State's Attorney Steve Kot
 Bailey Chase as DEA Agent David Lang
 Nick Gehlfuss as Dr. Will Halstead
 Robert Wisdom as Commander Ron Perry

Crossover characters
 Kara Killmer as Paramedic Sylvie Brett
 Eamonn Walker as Battalion Chief Wallace Boden
 Charlie Barnett as Paramedic in Charge Peter Mills
 Monica Raymund as Firefighter Gabriela Dawson
 Mariska Hargitay as Sergeant Olivia Benson
 Danny Pino as Detective Nick Amaro
 Ice-T as Detective Fin Tutuola
 Kelli Giddish as Detective Amanda Rollins
 Peter Scanavino as Detective Dominick "Sonny" Carisi, Jr.
 Jesse Spencer as Lieutenant Matthew Casey
 David Eigenberg as Lieutenant Christopher Herrmann
 Randy Flagler as Firefighter Capp
 Joe Minoso as Firefighter/Chauffeur Joe Cruz
 Christian Stolte as Firefighter Randy "Mouch" McHolland

Episodes

Production

Changes
Archie Kao's character Detective Sheldon Jin was killed in the first season's finale, thus his character will not be appearing in the second season of the show. However, showrunner Matt Olmstead revealed that "It [Jin's death] shakes everybody up...definitely for the next three or four episodes until people can re-galvanize as a family, but people have some hard feelings about how it all goes down."

Officer Kim Burgess would be joined by a new partner, whom Olmstead describes as being an important voice to the team in the second season and particularly for Burgess. Brian Geraghty was later announced to be portraying Sean Roman, the new partner of Kim Burgess (Marina Squerciati).

Jesse Lee Soffer revealed that there will be a lot more crossovers this season between Chicago P.D. and parent show Chicago Fire; "I think every episode from now on, they're going to have a couple characters from one show on the other" he told media sources.

Crossovers
On September 29, 2014, it was announced that Wolf's series: Chicago P.D., Chicago Fire and Law & Order: Special Victims Unit, would be involved in a three part crossover event airing between November 11 and November 12, 2014 starting with Chicago Fire and ending with Law & Order: Special Victims Unit and Chicago P.D..

Another crossover event aired on February 3 and February 4, 2015 starting with Chicago Fire and concluding with Chicago P.D..

A further crossover event aired on April 28 and April 29, 2015 starting with Chicago Fire, continuing with Chicago P.D. and concluding with Law & Order: Special Victims Unit.

Ratings

Home media
The DVD release of season two was released in Region 1 on September 1, 2015

References

External links

2014 American television seasons
2015 American television seasons
Chicago P.D. (TV series) seasons